The 1944–45 Wisconsin Badgers men's basketball team represented University of Wisconsin–Madison. The head coach was Harold E. Foster, coaching his eleventh season with the Badgers. The team played their home games at the UW Fieldhouse in Madison, Wisconsin and was a member of the Big Ten Conference.

Schedule

|-
!colspan=12| Regular Season

References

Wisconsin Badgers men's basketball seasons
Wisconsin
Wis
Wisc